Nikolay Tsvetkov (born 10 August 1987) is a Bulgarian footballer who plays as a midfielder.

Career
In June 2017, Tsvetkov joined Lokomotiv Sofia.

On 12 June 2018, Tsvetkov signed with CSKA 1948.

Honours

Club
CSKA Sofia
 Bulgarian Cup: 2015–16

References

External links
 

1986 births
Living people
People from Vidin
Bulgarian footballers
PFC Litex Lovech players
FC Dunav Ruse players
PFC Lokomotiv Mezdra players
PFC Spartak Pleven players
FC Sportist Svoge players
PFC Vidima-Rakovski Sevlievo players
OFC Bdin Vidin players
PFC CSKA Sofia players
SFC Etar Veliko Tarnovo players
FC Septemvri Sofia players
FC Lokomotiv 1929 Sofia players
FC CSKA 1948 Sofia players
FC Montana players
First Professional Football League (Bulgaria) players
Bulgarian expatriate footballers
Bulgarian expatriate sportspeople in Switzerland
Expatriate footballers in Switzerland
Association football midfielders